Vaneza Leza Pitynski (born September 1, 1988, in Whittier, California, USA) is an American actress, singer, voice actress, fashion blogger, and digital manager of German-Russian-Puerto Rican descent. She is best known for her roles as Lorena Garcia in Nickelodeon's The Brothers Garcia and Skye in Fatherhood. In 2001, Vaneza released her only album, Mr. Guapo through DDP Music when she was twelve years old and was also met with positive reviews from critics. Vaneza Pitynski reprised her role as Lorena Garcia one last time in The Brothers Garcia: Mysteries of the Maya. She released a CD single in 2003 for All I Wanna Do is Dance. She took a break acting in 2005 having begun professionally in 1998. She graduated from high school in 2006 and then attended college at the University of Southern California from 2006 to 2010, majoring in theater. She is a former fashion blogger and digital manager. In 2021 Vaneza announced that she would return to acting for the spin off of The Brothers Garcia titled The Garcias. The series will air on HBO Max. The Garcias will be produced by series writer Jeff Valdez. The Garcias premiered on April 14, 2022.

Filmography

True Friends (1998) – Young Angela
The Brothers Garcia (2000 - 2004) – Lorena Garcia
Megiddo: The Omega Code 2 (2001) – Girl in the church
The Brothers Garcia: Mysteries of the Maya (2003) - Lorena Garcia
Fatherhood (2004) – Skye (voice)
Rodney (2005) – Valerie
 The Garcias (2022) - Lorena Garcia Ramirez

Albums
 "Mr. Guapo" (August 3, 2001)

CD singles
 "Friends Forever" (2003) *Featured in "The Brothers Garcia: Mysteries of the Maya" only.*
 "All I Wanna Do is Dance" (2003)

References

External links
 
First Month's Rent
Vaneza Pitynski on Instagram
Vaneza Pitynski on LinkedIn

1988 births
Living people
20th-century American actresses
21st-century American actresses
Actresses from California
American actresses of Puerto Rican descent
American child actresses
American child singers
American bloggers
American people of German descent
American people of Russian descent
American television actresses
Musicians from Whittier, California
USC School of Dramatic Arts alumni
Actors from Whittier, California
American women bloggers
21st-century American singers